Skating rink may refer to:

 Ice rink, a surface of ice used for ice skating
 Roller rink, a surface used for roller skating
 Skating Rink, a 1922 symphonie chorégraphique by Honegger
 The Skating Rink, a 1993 novel by Roberto Bolaño
 The Skating Rink (opera), a 2018 opera, adapted from Bolaño's novel, by David Sawer

See also
Rink (disambiguation)
Skate (disambiguation)